The ICMJE recommendations (full title, "Recommendations for the Conduct, Reporting, Editing, and Publication of Scholarly Work in Medical Journals") are a set of guidelines produced by the International Committee of Medical Journal Editors for standardising the ethics, preparation and formatting of manuscripts submitted to biomedical journals for publication. Compliance with the ICMJE recommendations is required by most leading biomedical journals. Levels of real compliance are subject to debate. As of 9 January 2020, 5570 journals worldwide claim to follow the ICMJE recommendations.

The recommendations were first issued in 1979 under the title "Uniform Requirements for Manuscripts Submitted to Biomedical Journals" (abbreviated URMs and often shortened to "Uniform Requirements"). After a series of revisions, they were given their current name in 2013.

International Committee of Medical Journal Editors
The International Committee of Medical Journal Editors (ICMJE) was originally known as the Vancouver Group, after the location of their first meeting in Vancouver, British Columbia in Canada.  members of the ICMJE are:
 Annals of Internal Medicine
 BMJ
 Bulletin of the World Health Organization
 Deutsches Ärzteblatt
 Ethiopian Journal of Health Sciences
 Iranian Journal of Medical Sciences
 Journal of the American Medical Association (JAMA)
 New England Journal of Medicine
 Public Library of Science
 Journal of Korean Medical Science
 Revista Médica de Chile
 The Lancet
 The U.S. National Library of Medicine
 The New Zealand Medical Journal
 The World Association of Medical Editors
 Ugeskrift for Læger (Danish Medical Journal)

Citation style

The citation style recommended by the ICMJE Recommendations, which is also known as the Vancouver system, is the style used by the United States National Library of Medicine (NLM), codified in Citing Medicine.

References are numbered consecutively in order of appearance in the text – they are identified by Arabic numerals enclosed in parentheses.

Example of a journal citation:
 Leurs R, Church MK, Taglialatela M. H1-antihistamines: inverse agonism, anti-inflammatory actions and cardiac effects. Clin Exp Allergy 2002 Apr;32(4):489–498.

Manuscripts describing human interventional clinical trials
URM includes a mandate for manuscripts describing human interventional trials to register a trial in a clinical trial registry (e.g., ClinicalTrials.gov) and to include the trial registration ID in the abstract of the article. The URM also requires that this registration is done prior enrolling the first participant. A study of five high impact factor journals (founders of ICMJE) showed that only 89% of published articles (articles published during 2010–2011; about trials that completed in 2008) were properly registered prior enrolling the first participant.

Disclosure of competing interests
The ICMJE also developed a uniform format for disclosure of competing interests in journal articles.

Grey literature
The Uniform Requirements were adapted by the Grey Literature International Steering Committee GLISC for the production of scientific and technical reports included in the wider category of grey literature. These GLISC Guidelines for the production of scientific and technical reports are translated to French, German, Italian and Spanish and are available on the GLISC website .

See also
 Conflicts of interest in academic publishing
 EASE Guidelines for Authors and Translators of Scientific Articles
 IMRAD
 Scientific misconduct

References

External links
 About ICMJE
 The Recommendations for the Conduct, Reporting, Editing, and Publication of Scholarly work in Medical Journals
 National Library of Medicine – Uniform Requirements sample references
 Journals Following the Uniform Requirements for Manuscripts
 Use of Uniform Requirements for scientific and technical reports

Bibliography
Style guides for technical and scientific writing
Medical publishing
Scientific documents
Metascience
Science policy